G30 Schools, formerly known as G20 Schools, is an informal association of secondary schools initiated by David Wylde of St. Andrew's College, Grahamstown, South Africa and Anthony Seldon of Wellington College, Berkshire, United Kingdom in 2006.

All the schools claim to have a commitment to excellence and innovation.  The G30 Schools have an annual conference which aims to bring together a group of school heads who want to look beyond the parochial  issues of their own schools and national associations and to discuss key issues facing education and their roles as educational leaders.

The association includes 50 schools from 20 countries, with membership by invitation and a vote of existing members.  G30 schools are chosen on two criteria: the reputation of the school and the reputation of the school's leader.

Current members 
 
The King's School
Carey Baptist Grammar School, Melbourne
Cranbrook School, Sydney
Geelong Grammar School
St Peter’s College, Adelaide
Melbourne Grammar School

Appleby College
Upper Canada College

High School Affiliated to Renmin University of China
 
 Schule Schloss Salem
  
SOS-Hermann Gmeiner International College
 
 Chinese International School
 
 Mayo College, Ajmer
 Daly College, Indore
 The Doon School, Dehradun
 
 King's Academy
 
Brookhouse School
 
 Aitchison College, Lahore
  
 Markham College (Lima)
  
 Xavier School
 
 Raffles Institution
  
 Diocesan College
 St. Andrew's College, Grahamstown
 St. John's College, Johannesburg
 St Stithians College
 
 Korean Minjok Leadership Academy
 
 Sigtunaskolan Humanistiska Läroverket
  
 International School of Geneva
 
 Taipei American School
  
 Mahidol Wittayanusorn School
  
 Robert College
 
 Millfield
 Eton College
 Marlborough College
 Stowe School
 Wellington College
 
 Buckingham Browne & Nichols (MA)
 Harvard-Westlake School (CA)
 Phillips Academy Andover (MA)
 Phillips Exeter Academy (NH)
 University of Chicago Laboratory Schools (IL)

Conferences 

The G30 Schools conferences have been held in:

Former members 
 Argentina
 St. George's College, Quilmes
 Australia:
 Ivanhoe Grammar School
 Scotch College
 Hong Kong:
 Diocesan Girls' School
 India:
 Dhirubhai Ambani International School
 Maharani Gayatri Devi Girls' School
 The Sanskaar Valley School
 Welham Girls' School
 New Zealand:
 King's College (Auckland)
 Singapore:
 Hwa Chong Institution
 South Africa:
 Bishops Diocesan College
 St. Cyprian's School, Cape Town
 Tiger Kloof Educational Institute
 United Kingdom:
 Sevenoaks School
 United States:
Middlesex School (MA)
 Crossroads School (CA)
 Deerfield Academy (MA)
 Hotchkiss School (CT)
 Lawrenceville School (NJ)
 Polytechnic School (CA)

External links

References 

Associations of schools